Eric Peronnard is a French-born American creator and promoter of US Open, Minimoto and Endurocross. In 2011, the Endurocross was introduced to the X Games.

References

Living people
X Games athletes
Year of birth missing (living people)
Place of birth missing (living people)
French emigrants to the United States